Sunday Mornin' is an album by the American jazz guitarist Grant Green recorded for the Blue Note label in 1961, and released the following year. Bassist Ben Tucker and drummer Dave Bailey return from Green’s previous album, joined by pianist Kenny Drew. The CD reissue adds a bonus track recorded at the same session.

Reception

The AllMusic review by Steve Huey awarded the album 3 stars and stated "Green is tasteful and elegant as always, and the results make for an enjoyable addition to his discography, even if there are more distinctive Green albums available".

The All About Jazz review by Norman Weinstein awarded the album 4.5 stars and stated that "There's not a bad tune on this peerless set, and whatever your feelings about Green's place in jazz history, it's highly recommended".

Track listing
All compositions by Grant Green except as indicated

 "Freedom March" – 8:42
 "Sunday Mornin'" – 4:01
 "Exodus" (Ernest Gold) – 7:01
 "God Bless the Child" (Arthur Herzog, Jr. Billie Holiday) – 7:21
 "Come Sunrise" – 4:32
 "So What" (Miles Davis) – 9:48
 "Tracin' Tracy" – 5:39 Bonus track on CD reissue

Personnel
Grant Green – guitar
Kenny Drew – piano
Ben Tucker – bass
Ben Dixon – drums

References 

Grant Green albums
1962 albums
Blue Note Records albums
Albums produced by Alfred Lion
Albums recorded at Van Gelder Studio